CJHD-FM is a Canadian radio station that broadcasts an active rock format, branded as 93.3 The Rock at 93.3 FM in North Battleford, Saskatchewan, Canada. Its local sister stations are CJNB and CJCQ-FM. All three are located at 1711 100th Street in North Battleford.

The station is owned by the Jim Pattison Group, and was licensed in 2004.

References

External links
93.3 The Rock

North Battleford
Jhd
Jhd
Jhd
Radio stations established in 2004
2004 establishments in Saskatchewan